Hossam Hassan Mohamed Abdalla (born April 30, 1989 in Cairo, Egypt) is an Egyptian footballer who plays as a midfielder for Ceramica Cleopatra. He is the older brother of Ibrahim Hassan.

Hassan was included in Hany Ramzy's Egypt U-23 team for the 2012 Summer Olympics in London. He performed well as a central defensive midfielder. His good showing earned a loan move to Turkish Second division side Çaykur Rizespor on loan for one year.

References

External links
 

1989 births
Living people
Egyptian footballers
Al Masry SC players
Çaykur Rizespor footballers
Gil Vicente F.C. players
Primeira Liga players
Association football midfielders
Egyptian expatriate footballers
Egyptian expatriate sportspeople in Portugal
Expatriate footballers in Turkey
Expatriate footballers in Portugal
Egypt international footballers
2011 CAF U-23 Championship players
Olympic footballers of Egypt
Footballers at the 2012 Summer Olympics
Footballers from Cairo